Gregory Preston Spaid (born 1946) is an American artist known for his photographic and  mixed media works.

Early life
Spaid was born in Misihiwaka, Indiana. He studied at Kenyon College, receiving a B.A. degree in 1969, and at Indiana University, Bloomington, where he received an M.F.A. in art in 1976, having worked with the renowned photographer Henry Holmes Smith. He has been a professor of art at Kenyon College since 1979. From 1999 to 2002, Spaid moved to a position of Associate Provost at Kenyon College, serving as Acting Provost during the Academic Year 2002–03. He was named Kenyon's Provost in 2003, a position he held until 2008. He lives in Gambier, Ohio.

Collections
His work is included in the collections of the Getty Museum, the Museum of Modern Art, New York and the Smithsonian Museum of American Art.

Publications

Books

Grace: Photographs of Rural America. Asheville, NC: Safe Harbor Books, 2000.

On Nantucket. Asheville, NC: Safe Harbor Books, 2002.

Co-Author

Logsdon, Gene. The Man Who Created Paradise: A Fable. Foreword by Wendell Berry. Photography by Gregory Spaid. Athens, Ohio: Ohio University Press, 2001.

References

1946 births
20th-century American artists
Living people